The Selves is a river in the Aveyron department, France. It is a left tributary of the Truyère, into which it flows near Campouriez. It is approximately 44.5 km long.

References

Rivers of France
Rivers of Occitania (administrative region)
Rivers of Aveyron